Stranger Ballet is the sixth studio album by American musical group The Poison Control Center, released on June 7, 2011.

The album was recorded and produced in Chicago by The Poison Control Center and Nathan Cook (producer), with Mike Dixon co-engineering.  The album was mixed by A.J. Mogis in Omaha Nebraska.

Track listing

 "Torpedoes On Tuesday"
 "Some Ordinary Vision"
 "A Thousand Colors"
 "Dracula's Casket"
 "Seagull"
 "Underground Bed"
 "Born On Date"
 "Porcelain Brain"
 "Church On Mars"
 "Terminal"
 "Reoccurring Kind"

References

2011 albums
The Poison Control Center albums